The Supreme Court of Justice of El Salvador is the highest court of El Salvador.  The court sits in San Salvador.  The current president is Judge José Belarmino Jaime, who has held the position for three consecutive terms.

Composition and criteria
The Supreme Court is part of the judicial branch of El Salvador.  It is composed of 15 judges and an equal number of substitutes.  The magistrates are elected by the Legislative Assembly of El Salvador for nine-year terms, which are reviewed every three years.  A two-thirds vote of legislators is necessary.  Under the 1983 Constitution of El Salvador, the legislature also designates one judge as the President of the Supreme Court.  This person is also then the head of the judicial branch and the Constitutional Court.

Article 176 of the Constitution establishes the criteria for a Supreme Court judgeship:
Born in El Salvador
"Belong to the secular state" (that is, not be ordained to the priesthood)
More than 40 years old
Be an Attorney of the Republic
Be of good moral character and good reputation for competence
have been a Second Instance Magistrate for six years or a First Instance Magistrate for nine years, or have practiced law for ten years' minimum before joining the court.
Have not been deprived of any privileges of citizenship in the last six years

Organization and functions
The Supreme Court is organized into four courts:
Constitutional Court, with five judges.  According to Article 174 of the constitution, the court is the only tribunal to decide cases related to:
the constitutionality of laws, decrees, and regulations
amparo (constitutional protection except for physical liberty, covered by habeas)
habeas corpus
controversies between the legislative and executive branches
Administrative Disputes Court, with four judges.  This court hears cases related to:
Controversies between the public administration and "los particulares" related to administrative remedies
Civil Court, three judges, charged with:
Appeals in civil, economic, labor and family matters
Criminal Court, three judges
Appeals in criminal cases.

Current members
In 2009, the Legislative Assembly elected Supreme Court judges for the period from July 16, 2009 through July 15, 2018.  However, judges sitting on the Constitutional bench will serve for the period from July 16, 2012 through July 15, 2021, with the exception of Judge Bonilla Flores whose term ends in 2015.

Notes:

¹ President of the Supreme Court and the Constitutional Court;
² President of the respective chambers.

History
On April 21, 1825, the National Congress chose a President of the Central American Republic (Manuel José Arce) and also the first Supreme Court.  Choosing the president was a simple matter, but the Supreme Court less so.  The law mandated that the members of the court be elected by popular vote, and by the Legislative Assembly if no one obtained a majority.  Finally, Congress chose the following people for the first Supreme Court:
President Tomás O'Horán, a notable attorney from Yucatán who had played an important role in the colonial regime.  Following independence, he became a politician in Guatemala.
Antonio Rivera Cabezas
Mariano Gálvez
Justo Berrera
José Manuel de la Cerda
Marcial Zebadísa
Alejandro Díaz Cabeza de Vaca.

This court began its work on April 25, 1825.

Following the end of the Salvadoran Civil War, the Commission on the Truth for El Salvador and the Ad Hoc Commission identified weaknesses in the judiciary and recommended solutions, the most dramatic being the replacement of all the judges on the Supreme Court. This recommendation was fulfilled in 1994 when an entirely new court was elected.

Criticism
One problem the Supreme Court needs to solve is the speed with which the courts resolve criminal cases.  In 2000, for example, some 48% of prisoners did not have a firm sentence.

On the other hand, the Supreme Court will decide against the executive branch, demonstrating some independence.  There is constant battle between the judicial and executive branch over the application of the anti-gang laws.

But at the national level, the Supreme Court is criticized for being too dependent on the legislative branch, who is responsible for naming the judges. At the time of election of judges, the different parties negotiate their votes, and the election is usually a form of political compromise.  Judges are also thought to be of varied quality throughout the country, and in some places, cases take a very long time and many years are spent resolving controversial cases.  The Constitutional Court has also been criticized for taking too long to issue decisions, which some say results in justice delayed too long.

References

External links
Official Web Site (in Spanish)
Judicial Documentation Center of El Salvador (in Spanish)

Judiciary of El Salvador
Government of El Salvador
El Salvador
1825 establishments in El Salvador
Courts and tribunals established in 1825